Dysderidae, also known as woodlouse hunters, sowbug-eating spiders, and cell spiders, is a family of araneomorph spiders first described by Carl Ludwig Koch in 1837. They are found primarily in Eurasia, extending into North Africa with very few species occurring in South America. Dysdera crocata is introduced into many regions of the world.

Dysderids have six eyes, and are haplogyne, i.e. the females lack a sclerotized epigyne. There is a substantial number of genera, but two of them, Dysdera and Harpactea, account for a very large number of the species and are widespread across the family's range. One species, Dysdera crocata (the woodlouse hunter), has been transported over much of the planet together with its preferred foods—woodlice. Dysdera also feeds on beetles. These spiders have very large chelicerae, which they use to pierce the armored bodies of woodlice and beetles.  There are also some reports that they have a mildly toxic venom that can cause local reactions in humans.

The spiders have their six eyes arranged in a semicircle like segestrids, but have only the first two pairs of legs produced forward. Dysdera crocata has a characteristic coloring, which can only be confused with spiders in the trachelid genera Trachelas and Meriola: the carapace is dull red-brown and the abdomen gray or tan.

Genera

The categorization into subfamilies follows Joel Hallan's Biology Catalog. , the World Spider Catalog accepts the following genera:

 Dysderinae C. L. Koch, 1837
 Cryptoparachtes Dunin, 1992 (Georgia, Azerbaijan)
 Dysdera Latreille, 1804 (worldwide)
 Dysderella Dunin, 1992 (Azerbaijan, Turkmenistan))
 Dysderocrates Deeleman-Reinhold & Deeleman, 1988 (Balkans)
 Harpactocrates Simon, 1914 (Europe)
 Hygrocrates Deeleman-Reinhold, 1988 (Georgia, Turkey)
 Parachtes Alicata, 1964 (Southern Europe)
 Rhodera Deeleman-Reinhold, 1989 (Crete)
 Stalitochara Simon, 1913 (Algeria)
 Tedia Simon, 1882 (Israel, Syria)
 Harpacteinae
 Dasumia Thorell, 1875 (Europe, Middle East)
 Folkia Kratochvíl, 1970 (Balkans)
 Harpactea Bristowe, 1939 (Europe to Iran, Mediterranean)
 Holissus Simon, 1882 (Corsica)
 Kaemis Deeleman-Reinhold, 1993 (Italy)
 Minotauria Kulczyn'ski, 1903 (Crete)
 Sardostalita Gasparo, 1999 (Sardinia)
 Stalagtia Kratochvíl, 1970 (Balkans, Greece)
 Rhodinae
 Mesostalita Deeleman-Reinhold, 1971 (Balkans, Italy)
 Parastalita Absolon & Kratochvíl, 1932 (Bosnia-Herzegovina)
 Rhode Simon, 1882 (Mediterranean)
 Speleoharpactea Ribera, 1982 (Spain)
 Stalita Schiödte, 1847 (Balkans)
 Stalitella Absolon & Kratochvíl, 1932 (Balkans)
 incertae sedis
 Thereola Petrunkevitch, 1955 † (fossil, Oligocene)
 Thereola petiolata (Koch & Berendt, 1854) †

See also
 List of Dysderidae species

References

External links

 

 
Araneomorphae families
Taxa named by Carl Ludwig Koch